Virginia Carter (born 1936) is a Canadian-born physicist and entertainment executive.

Carter was born in Arvida, Quebec in 1936. She studied math and physics at McGill University and graduated magna cum laude in 1958. She then earned a master's degree from the University of Southern California. She was hired by the Douglas Aircraft Corporation in 1962. She then went to work for The Aerospace Corporation, where she was their sole female physicist. She stayed with Aerospace Corp. for nine years, conducting research on vacuum ultraviolet spectroscopy and high atmospheric conditions.

Carter was a spokesperson for the women's movement in the early 1970s and was president of the National Organization for Women's Los Angeles chapter. She stepped down from the position after she was diagnosed with breast cancer. She also advocated for passage of the Equal Rights Amendment.

Carter met Frances Lear through their common activism in the feminist movement. She introduced Carter to her husband, television producer Norman Lear. Starting in 1973, she became director of creative affairs for him at Embassy Television. She worked on the sitcoms Maude and All in the Family. In 1976 she was promoted to vice president for creative affairs.

Carter started a film division at Tandem and was the executive producer for the 1981 film The Wave. The film, based on The Third Wave experiment, won Peabody and Emmy Awards.

After Tandem was sold to Coca-Cola in the 1980s, Carter became president of J.O. Crystal, a firm that manufactures synthetic rubies. She retired from management of the firm in 2002. She also worked with the Population Media Center.

References

Further reading
Virginia Carter, Veteran Feminists of America

External links 

 Portrait of Virginia Carter in her lab at Aerospace Corp. in California, 1972. Los Angeles Times Photographic Archive (Collection 1429). UCLA Library Special Collections, Charles E. Young Research Library, University of California, Los Angeles.

1936 births
Living people
American women business executives
American women's rights activists
Anglophone Quebec people
Canadian emigrants to the United States
Canadian physicists
McGill University Faculty of Science alumni
Activists from Quebec
Businesspeople from Quebec
Scientists from Quebec
University of Southern California alumni
Canadian women physicists
21st-century American women